Eirmotus insignis is a species of cyprinid in the genus Eirmotus. It inhabits Borneo and Belitung in Indonesia.

References

Cyprinidae
Cyprinid fish of Asia
Fish of Indonesia